Captain Daniel Fones (born 9 March 1713, Conanicut Island, Jamestown, Rhode Island – , North Kingstown, Washington, Rhode Island) was the leading military commander for Rhode Island in the Siege of Louisbourg (1745). He was the captain of Tartar, the privateer vessel was the Rhode Island contribution to the victory in the Siege of Louisbourg (1745) (the 150 soldiers from Rhode Island arrived after the Siege).

Fones took command of Tartar at the outbreak of King Georges War.  In April 1745, Fones successfully escorted the 500 soldiers in seven transports to Canso, Nova Scotia. During the voyage he drew fire from the French 32-gun frigate Renommée, under Kersaint-Coëtnempren, in an eight-hour engagement.  In May 1745, participating in the blockade of Louisbourg, Fones captured the French merchant ship Deux Amies.  In June he participated in the Naval battle off Tatamagouche.  In the battle, Fones rescued the Connecticut warship Resolution and crushed the French and Indian expedition en route to save Louisbourg. 

After the war he commanded the privateer Prince Frederick, the Defiance and Success.

After he retired from the sea, he represented North Kingstown in the General Assembly.  Then in 1770, he opened David Fones Tavern at 126 Main St., North Kingstown.  His father Jeremiah Fones was buried at Chestnut Hill Cemetery, Exeter, Washington County, Rhode Island.

References 

Texts
 Chapin, Howard M., The Tartar: The Armed Sloop of the Colony of Rhode Island (The Society of Colonial Wars in Rhode Island, 1922) 
G. Timothy Cranston.  Capt. Daniel Fones: Local war hero and privateer. The Independent. Feb 26, 2015
Colonial Navy

History of Nova Scotia
1713 births
1790 deaths
People from Jamestown, Rhode Island
Military personnel from Rhode Island
Members of the Rhode Island General Assembly